Fritzing is an open-source initiative to develop amateur or hobby CAD software for the design of electronics hardware, intended to allow designers and artists to build more permanent circuits from prototypes. It was developed at the University of Applied Sciences Potsdam. Fritzing is free software under the GPL 3.0 or later license, with the source code available on GitHub and the binaries at a monetary cost, which is allowed by the GPL.

Goals 

The software was created with inspiration from the Processing programming language and the Arduino microcontroller and allows a designer, artist, researcher, or hobbyist to document their Arduino-based prototype and create a PCB layout for manufacturing. The associated website helps users share and discuss drafts and experiences as well as to reduce manufacturing costs.

Fritzing can be seen as an electronic design automation (EDA) tool for non-engineers: the input metaphor is inspired by the environment of designers (the breadboard-based prototype), while the output is focused on accessible means of production. As of December 2, 2014 Fritzing has made a code view option, where one can modify code and upload it directly to an Arduino device.

Component images are distributed under CC BY-SA 3.0, which will also be the license for any generated breadboard views.

Maker 

Fritzing allows for creation of printed circuit boards. Fritzing provides access to a commercial service known as ‘FritzingFab’ to order PCBs created with designs made on the Fritzing software.

Simulator 
Since version 0.9.10, Fritzing incorporates a basic simulator, which is still in beta. The main aim of the simulator is to teach electronics to beginners, and Fritzing version 0.9.10 only supports analysis of DC circuits. The simulator works on the breadboard and schematic views. In addition, it checks that the parts are working within their specifications (otherwise, a smoke symbol appears). The simulator provides multimeters to read voltages and currents and it attempts to recreate a realistic laboratory session.

See also

 Comparison of EDA software
List of free and open source software packages
 List of free electronics circuit simulators

References

External links 

 
 User Forum
 FabService
 
 
 Fritzing overview

Free electronic design automation software
Physical computing
Electronic design automation software for Linux
Engineering software that uses Qt